Sir Horace Rumbold, 8th Baronet,  (2 July 1829 – 3 November 1913) was a British diplomat who was minister or ambassador to several countries.  He succeeded his brother, Charles, as Baronet in 1877.

Career
He was educated privately in Paris and (no examinations being then required) was introduced into the diplomatic service by Lord Palmerston in 1849. He was posted in the same year as attaché to Turin (then the capital of the Kingdom of Sardinia-Piedmont) and subsequently served at Paris, Frankfurt, Stuttgart, Vienna and Ragusa. In December 1858 he was appointed secretary of the legation in China and went there in March 1859. The minister, Frederick Bruce, sent him back to England in January 1860 to report to the British government the active resistance which was offered to the progress of the British mission to the Chinese capital. This report led to the Anglo-French expedition to Peking (Beijing) in that year (in the second phase of the Second Opium War).

Rumbold then held a succession of further posts as secretary of legation or embassy in Athens, Bern, St Petersburg and Constantinople. He then became Minister to Chile 1872–78; to the Swiss Confederation 1878–79; to Argentina 1879–81; to Sweden and Norway 1881–84; to Greece 1884–88; to the Netherlands 1888–96; and finally Ambassador to Austria 1896–1900.

Family
Rumbold was the fourth son of Sir William Rumbold, 3rd Baronet (1787–1833), and Henrietta Elizabeth née Parkyns (1789–1830).  His wives were Caroline Burney (d. 1872), daughter of US Minister to Bern George Harrington, and Louisa Anne (d. 1940), daughter of Thomas Russell Crampton.  His sons were the diplomat Horace, who succeeded as 9th baronet, and Hugo, a theatrical scenery and costume designer.

Honours
Horace Rumbold succeeded to the Rumbold baronetcy on the death of his brother, the 7th Baronet, in 1877. He was knighted KCMG in 1886, promoted to GCMG in 1892 and given the additional honour of GCB in the Queen's Birthday Honours of 1897. He was made a Privy Counsellor in 1896.

Publications
The great silver river: notes of a residence in Buenos Ayres in 1880 and 1881, John Murray, London, 1890
An English tribute to the Emperor Francis Joseph in The National Review, London, November 1902
Recollections of a diplomatist, Edward Arnold, London, 1902
Further Recollections of a Diplomatist, Edward Arnold, London, 1903
Final recollections of a diplomatist [1885-1900], Edward Arnold, London, 1905
The Austrian court in the nineteenth century, Methuen, London, 1909

Notes

References

External links

1829 births
1913 deaths
Baronets in the Baronetage of Great Britain
Ambassadors of the United Kingdom to Argentina
Ambassadors of the United Kingdom to Sweden
Ambassadors of the United Kingdom to Greece
Ambassadors of the United Kingdom to the Netherlands
Ambassadors of the United Kingdom to Switzerland
Members of the Privy Council of the United Kingdom
Knights Grand Cross of the Order of the Bath
Knights Grand Cross of the Order of St Michael and St George
Ambassadors of the United Kingdom to Austria-Hungary